Seth Woodbury MacFarlane (born October 26, 1973) is an American actor, animator, filmmaker, comedian, and singer. MacFarlane is the creator and star of the television series Family Guy (since 1999) and The Orville (since 2017), and co-creator of the television series American Dad! (since 2005) and The Cleveland Show (2009–2013). He also wrote, directed, and starred in the films Ted (2012), its sequel Ted 2 (2015), and A Million Ways to Die in the West (2014).

MacFarlane is a graduate of the Rhode Island School of Design, where he studied animation. Recruited to Hollywood, he was an animator and writer for Hanna-Barbera for television series including Johnny Bravo, Cow and Chicken, Dexter's Laboratory, and the animated short Larry & Steve for What A Cartoon!. MacFarlane made guest appearances as an actor on television series such as Gilmore Girls, The War at Home, Star Trek: Enterprise, and FlashForward. In 2008, he created the YouTube series Seth MacFarlane's Cavalcade of Cartoon Comedy. He won several awards for his work on Family Guy, including five Primetime Emmy Awards and an Annie Award. In 2009, he won the Webby Award for Film & Video Person of the Year.

MacFarlane has performed as a singer at Carnegie Hall in New York City and the Royal Albert Hall in London. He has released seven studio albums, in the vein of Frank Sinatra, with influences from jazz orchestrations, and Hollywood musicals beginning with Music Is Better Than Words in 2011. MacFarlane has received five Grammy Award nominations for his work. He has frequently collaborated with artists such as Sara Bareilles, Norah Jones, and Elizabeth Gillies on his albums. MacFarlane has also sung with Gwen Stefani, Meghan Trainor, Ariana Grande, and Barbra Streisand. He hosted the 85th Academy Awards in 2013 and was nominated for Best Original Song for "Everybody Needs a Best Friend" from Ted.

MacFarlane was executive producer of the Neil deGrasse Tyson-hosted Cosmos: A Spacetime Odyssey, an update of the 1980s Cosmos series hosted by Carl Sagan. In 2019 he received a star on the Hollywood Walk of Fame. In 2020, he was inducted into the Television Hall of Fame.

Early life and education
MacFarlane was born and raised in Kent, Connecticut. His parents, Ronald Milton MacFarlane and Ann Perry (née Sager), were born in Newburyport, Massachusetts. His younger sister Rachael is also a voice actress. He has roots in New England going back to the 1600s, and is a descendant of Mayflower passenger William Brewster. MacFarlane's parents met in 1970 when they lived and worked in Boston, Massachusetts, and married later that year. They moved to Kent in 1972, where Ann began working in the admissions office at South Kent School. She later worked in the college guidance and admissions offices at the Kent School, a selective college preparatory school, where Ronald was a teacher.

As a child, MacFarlane developed an interest in illustration, and at the age of two he began drawing cartoon characters such as Fred Flintstone and Woody Woodpecker. By age five, he knew he wanted to pursue a career in animation, and began by creating flip books after his parents found a book on the subject for him. Four years later, at nine, he began publishing a weekly comic strip, Walter Crouton, for The Kent Good Times Dispatch, the local newspaper; it paid him five dollars per week. MacFarlane said in an October 2011 interview that as a child he was always "weirdly fascinated by the Communion ceremony". He created a strip with a character kneeling at the altar taking Communion and asking "Can I have fries with that?" The paper printed it and he got an "angry letter" from the local priest; it led to "sort of a little mini-controversy" in the town.

MacFarlane received his high school diploma in 1991 from the Kent School. While there, he continued experimenting with animation, and his parents gave him an 8 mm camera. He went on to study film, video, and animation at the Rhode Island School of Design (RISD), where he earned a Bachelor of Fine Arts degree. As a student, he intended to work for Disney but changed his mind after graduating.

At RISD, MacFarlane created a series of independent films, meeting future Family Guy cast member Mike Henry, whose brother Patrick was MacFarlane's classmate. During his time at RISD, he performed stand-up comedy. In his senior year, he made a thesis film, The Life of Larry, which became the inspiration for Family Guy. A professor submitted his film to the animation studio Hanna-Barbera, where he was later hired.

Career

Television career

Hanna-Barbera years
MacFarlane was recruited during the senior film festival by development executive Ellen Cockrill and President Fred Seibert. He went to work at Hanna-Barbera (then Hanna-Barbera Cartoons) based on the writing content of The Life of Larry, rather than on his drawing abilities. He was one of only a few people hired by the company solely based on writing talent. He worked as an animator and writer for Cartoon Network's Cartoon Cartoons series. He created a sequel to The Life of Larry entitled Larry & Steve, featuring a middle-aged character named Larry and an intellectual dog, Steve. The short was broadcast as one of Cartoon Network's World Premiere Toons. He described the atmosphere at Hanna-Barbera as resembling an "old-fashioned Hollywood structure, where you move from one show to another or you jump from a writing job on one show to a storyboard job on another". MacFarlane worked on three television series during his tenure at the studio: Dexter's Laboratory, Cow and Chicken, and Johnny Bravo. Working as both a writer and storyboard artist, MacFarlane spent the most time on Johnny Bravo. He found it easier to develop his own style at Johnny Bravo through the show's process of scriptwriting, which Dexter's Laboratory and Cow and Chicken did not use. As a part of the Johnny Bravo crew, he met actors and voiceover artists such as Adam West and Jack Sheldon of Schoolhouse Rock! fame. These meetings later became significant to the production and success of his Family Guy series.

He also did freelance work for Walt Disney Television Animation, writing for Jungle Cubs, and for Nelvana, where he wrote for Ace Ventura: Pet Detective. Through strict observation of writing elements such as story progression, character stakes and plot points, MacFarlane found the work for Disney was, from a writing standpoint, very valuable in preparation for his career (particularly on Ace Ventura). He also created and wrote a short titled Zoomates for Frederator Studios' Oh Yeah! Cartoons on Nickelodeon. Executives at the Fox Broadcasting Company saw both Larry shorts and negotiations soon began for a prime-time animated series.

Family Guy

Although MacFarlane enjoyed working at Hanna-Barbera, he felt his real calling was for prime-time animation, which would allow a much edgier style of humor. He first pitched Family Guy to Fox during his tenure at Hanna-Barbera. A development executive there, who was trying to get back into prime-time business, introduced MacFarlane to Leslie Kolins and Mike Darnell, heads of the alternative comedy department at Fox. After the success of King of the Hill in 1997, MacFarlane called Kolins once more to ask about a possible second pitch for the series. Fox offered the young writer a strange deal: They gave him a budget of US$50,000 to produce a pilot that could lead to a series (most episodes of animated prime-time productions cost at least US$1 million). Recalling the experience in an interview with The New York Times, MacFarlane said, "I spent about six months with no sleep and no life, just drawing like crazy in my kitchen and doing this pilot".

After six months, MacFarlane returned to Fox with a "very, very simply, crudely animated film—with just enough to get the tone of the show across" to present to the executives, who loved the pilot and immediately ordered the series. In July 1998, they announced the purchase of Family Guy for a January 1999 debut. Family Guy was originally intended to be a series of shorts on MADtv, much in the same way The Simpsons had begun on The Tracey Ullman Show a decade earlier. Negotiations for the show's MADtv connection fell through early on as a result of budgetary concerns. At age 24, MacFarlane was television's youngest executive producer.

Family Guy first aired January 31, 1999. MacFarlane's work in animating Family Guy was influenced by Jackie Gleason and Hanna-Barbera along with examples from The Simpsons and All in the Family. In addition to writing three episodes, "Death Has a Shadow", "Family Guy Viewer Mail 1" and "North by North Quahog", MacFarlane voices Family Guys main male characters of Peter Griffin, Stewie Griffin, Brian Griffin and Glenn Quagmire, as well as Tom Tucker, his son Jake Tucker, and other characters. Bolstered by high DVD sales and fan loyalty, Family Guy developed into a US$1-billion franchise. On May 4, 2008, after approximately two and a half years of negotiations, MacFarlane reached a US$100-million agreement with Fox to keep Family Guy and American Dad! until 2012. It made him the world's highest paid television writer.

MacFarlane's success with Family Guy opened doors to other ventures relating to the show. On April 26, 2005, he and composer Walter Murphy created Family Guy: Live in Vegas. The soundtrack features a Broadway show tune theme, and MacFarlane voiced Stewie in the track "Stewie's Sexy Party". A fan of Broadway musicals, MacFarlane comments on using musicals as a component of Family Guy:

A Family Guy video game was released in 2006. Two years later, in August 2007, MacFarlane closed a digital content production deal with AdSense. He takes cast members on the road to voice characters in front of live audiences. Family Guy Live provides fans with the opportunity to hear future scripts. In mid-2007, Chicago fans had the opportunity to hear the then upcoming sixth-season premiere "Blue Harvest". Shows have played in Montreal, New York City, Chicago, and Los Angeles.

On July 22, 2007, in an interview with The Hollywood Reporter, MacFarlane announced that he might start work on a feature film, although "nothing's official". In September 2007, Ricky Blitt gave TV.com an interview confirming that he had already started working on the script. Then in TV Week on July 18, 2008, MacFarlane confirmed plans to produce a theatrically released Family Guy feature film sometime "within the next year". He came up with an idea for the story, "something that you could not do on the show, which [to him] is the only reason to do a movie". He later went on to say he imagines the film to be "an old-style musical with dialogue" similar to The Sound of Music, saying that he would "really be trying to capture, musically, that feel". On October 13, 2011, MacFarlane confirmed that a deal for a Family Guy film had been made, and that he would write it with series co-producer Ricky Blitt. On November 30, 2012, he confirmed plans for the project. The project was put on hold while MacFarlane worked on Ted 2. In 2018, Fox announced that a live-action/animated film based on the series is in development. MacFarlane stepped away from the series in 2011 to work on Ted and other projects, and has only been associated with the show as a voice actor since then.

Despite its popularity, Family Guy has often been criticized. The Parents Television Council has been a frequent critic. It organized a letter-writing campaign to remove it from Fox's lineup, and filed complaints with the Federal Communications Commission alleging that some of its episodes contained indecent content. MacFarlane has responded to the PTC's criticism by saying, among other things, "That's like getting hate mail from Hitler. They're literally terrible human beings."

Family Guy has been cancelled twice, although strong fan support and DVD sales have caused Fox to reconsider. MacFarlane mentioned how these cancellations affected the lineup of writers: "One of the positive aspects of Family Guy constantly being pulled off [the air] is that we were always having to restaff writers".

During its sixth season, episodes of Family Guy and American Dad! were delayed from regular broadcast due to the 2007–2008 Writers Guild of America strike. MacFarlane participated in the strike to support the writers, and Fox aired three Family Guy episodes without his permission. The strike ended on February 12, 2008, and the series resumed airing regularly, beginning with "Back to the Woods".

American Dad!

MacFarlane has a second long-running, successful adult animated series in American Dad! which has been in production since early 2005. To date, it is his only animated series that has never been cancelled, though it did undergo a network relocation from Fox to TBS on October 20, 2014, following its 11th season. TBS announced on July 16, 2013 that they had picked up the series for a 15-episode 12th season. The purpose of the network relocation was originally to make room for new animated broadcasts, such as Mulaney and another animated series from Seth MacFarlane called Bordertown, on Fox's now-defunct "Animation Domination".

While MacFarlane does extensive voice acting work for American Dad!, he has left much of its creative direction up to Matt Weitzman and Mike Barker, feeling it helps give the series its own voice and identity. It was announced on November 4, 2013 that Barker would depart American Dad! after 10 seasons as producer/co-showrunner, due to creative differences as production for season 11 on TBS began.

American Dad! was first shown after Super Bowl XXXIX, debuting with the episode "Pilot", which MacFarlane co-wrote. This February 6, 2005, series premiere was somewhat of an early sneak preview as the program did not begin airing regularly until May 1, 2005. Because of atypical scheduling of the show's first 7 episodes, American Dad! has a controversial season number discrepancy in which many are divided as to how many seasons the program has had. Beyond division between media journalists and fans, there have been conflicting reports as to what season the show is in even between American Dad! creators and the show's official website—both from its original Fox website and now from TBS website. At San Diego Comic-Con in 2013, Barker hinted that an American Dad! movie—centering on the Roger character and set from his birth planet—is in the works and partially written. However, at San Diego Comic-Con in 2022, Weitzman revealed plans for the film were scrapped.

MacFarlane has described the initial seasons of American Dad! as being similar to All in the Family, likening title character Stan Smith's originally bigoted persona to Archie Bunker. MacFarlane has also stated that his inspiration to create American Dad! derived from his and Weitzman's exasperation with George W. Bush's policies as former United States President. After the early couple of seasons however, the series discontinued using these elements of political satire and began to serve up its own brand of entertainment and humor. MacFarlane was described as having difficulty understanding the series in its early going; however, he heavily warmed up to the series after its early seasons once he felt the show truly came into its own. His fellow co-creators have sensed this through MacFarlane's greatly increased attention to the series after its early seasons. MacFarlane has also revealed he is an American Dad! fan himself. He has taken note of the positive reaction to the "Roger" character by fans via his Twitter.

The show focuses on the Smith family: Stan Smith, the endangering, dog-eat-dog, rash and inconsiderate head of the household. He has an exaggeratedly large chin and masculine manner about him. As the family's breadwinner, he works as a CIA officer and was initially portrayed in the series as an old-fashioned conservative bigot but has since grown out of these traits (the show is known for its story arc elements and other distinguishing plot techniques); Stan's paradoxically moralistic yet simultaneously inappropriate, corrupt wife, Francine; and their two children, new-age hippie daughter Hayley and nerdy son Steve. Accompanying the Smith family are three additional main characters, two of which belong to non-human species: zany, shocking, blithely cruel and rascally alien Roger, who's full of disguises/alter egos and has few if any limits on his behaviors. He was rescued by Stan from Area 51; Klaus, the man-in-a-fish-body pet. Klaus's unenviable situation came about from the brain of an East German Olympic skier being shrunk and transplanted into a fish body; and Jeff Fischer, Hayley's boyfriend turned "whipped" husband, known for his infatuation with Hayley's mom, Francine. Together, the Smiths and their three housemates run what is only at a first glance the typical middle-class American lifestyle, but is anything but.

MacFarlane provides the voices of Stan and Roger, basing Roger's voice on Paul Lynde (who played Uncle Arthur in Bewitched). His sister Rachael MacFarlane provides the voice of Hayley.

The Cleveland Show

MacFarlane developed a Family Guy spin-off called The Cleveland Show, which focuses on the character of Cleveland Brown and his family. The idea for the show originated from a suggestion by Family Guy writer and voice of Cleveland, Mike Henry. Fox ordered 22 episodes and the series first aired on September 27, 2009. The show, which was picked up to air a first season consisting of 22 episodes, was picked up by Fox for a second season, consisting of 13 episodes, bringing the total number to 35 episodes. The announcement was made on May 3, 2009, before the first season even premiered. Due to strong ratings, Fox picked up the back nine episodes of season 2, making a 22-episode season and bringing the total episode count of the show to 44. The series ended on May 19, 2013, with a total of 4 seasons and 88 episodes. The character of Cleveland and his family returned to Family Guy in the episode "He's Bla-ack!".

This is the only animated series created by MacFarlane that does not have him voicing the main character. MacFarlane did, however, play the character Tim the Bear until season 3 episode 10. Jess Harnell voiced Tim from season 3 episode 11 onwards.

Cavalcade of Cartoon Comedy

In 2008, MacFarlane released a series of webisodes known as Seth MacFarlane's Cavalcade of Cartoon Comedy with its animated shorts sponsored by Burger King and released weekly.

The Orville

In 2016, MacFarlane began producing the sci-fi comedy-drama series The Orville, in which he also stars as Captain Edward "Ed" Mercer. MacFarlane originally wrote The Orville as a spec script, which was given a 13-episode order by Fox in May 2016, making it the first live-action television series created by MacFarlane. The series premiered on September 10, 2017. Despite the first season receiving negative reviews, it was renewed for a second season. The second season premiered on December 30, 2018 and received better reviews.

The series was renewed for a third season by Fox, however the series would move over to Hulu. This season is the show's first on Hulu, after airing its previous two seasons on Fox, as well as the first to premiere since The Walt Disney Company's March 2019 acquisition of 20th Century Fox. The season was originally scheduled to premiere in 2020 but was delayed due to the COVID-19 pandemic. The third season titled as The Orville: New Horizons premiered on June 2, 2022. Due to the pandemic, an episode of third season was scrapped, which MacFarlane turned it into a novel, titled The Orville: Sympathy for the Devil.

Television producing
MacFarlane was the executive producer of a live-action sitcom starring Rob Corddry called The Winner. The plot has a man named Glen discussing the time he matured at 32 and has him pursuing his only love after she moves in next door. Glen meets her son and both become good friends. The show ran on Fox for six episodes in Spring 2007.

In August 2011, Fox ordered a 13-part updated series of Cosmos: A Spacetime Odyssey. MacFarlane co-produced the series with Ann Druyan and Steven Soter. The new series is hosted by Neil deGrasse Tyson and began airing on the channel in March 2014, with repeats airing on the National Geographic Channel on the next night. In addition to serving as one of the executive producers, MacFarlane provided voices for characters during the animated portions of the series.

In 2013 and 2014, MacFarlane produced one season of a live-action sitcom called Dads. The series, revolves around Eli, played by Seth Green, and Warner, played by Giovanni Ribisi, two successful guys in their 30s whose world is turned upside down when their dads move in with them. MacFarlane, Alec Sulkin and Wellesley Wild executive-produced the series, with Sulkin and Wild writing.

In 2014, MacFarlane executive-produced a two-season, 20-episode series called Blunt Talk for Starz. The series followed an English newscaster who moves to Los Angeles with his alcoholic manservant and the baggage of several failed marriages to host a sanctimonious talk show.

In 2009, MacFarlane began work on the animated series Bordertown. The series is set in Texas and follows a border patrol agent and a Mexican immigrant, satirizing America's changing cultural landscape. It ran for 13 episodes in the first half of 2016, on Fox.

Television hosting
MacFarlane often participates as one of the "roasters" in the annual Comedy Central Roasts. MacFarlane is the only person to serve as roastmaster for more than one Comedy Central roast. In 2010, he filled this role for The Comedy Central Roast of David Hasselhoff. The following year he was roastmaster of Comedy Central roasts of Donald Trump and Charlie Sheen.

On October 1, 2012, it was announced that MacFarlane would host the 85th Academy Awards on February 24, 2013. He also presented the nominees with actress Emma Stone, on January 10, 2013. In addition to hosting, MacFarlane was also nominated in the Academy Award for Best Original Song category for co-writing the theme song "Everybody Needs a Best Friend" for his film Ted with Walter Murphy. Critical response to MacFarlane's performance was mixed. Columnist Owen Gleiberman of Entertainment Weekly commented "By calling constant attention to the naughty factor," MacFarlane created "an echo chamber of outrage, working a little too hard to top himself with faux-scandalous gags about race, Jews in Hollywood, and the killing of Abraham Lincoln." Tim Goodman of The Hollywood Reporter praised MacFarlane's performance saying that he did "impressively better than one would have wagered." He also noted that he added "plenty of niceties with a little bit of the Ricky Gervais bite-the-hand-that-feeds-you thing and worked the juxtaposition rather nicely." He stirred up controversy in the form of a musical number titled "We Saw Your Boobs".

On October 29, 2014, it was announced that MacFarlane would host the Breakthrough Prize ceremony. The event was held in Silicon Valley and televised on November 15, 2014, on Discovery Channel and Science, and globally on November 22, 2014, on BBC World News. He returned to host the following year.

Film career

Ted

MacFarlane made his directorial live-action film debut with the release of Ted in 2012. He announced that he was directing it on an episode of Conan that aired on February 10, 2011. Along with directing the film, he also wrote the screenplay, served as producer, and starred as the title character.

Ted tells the story of John Bennett (Mark Wahlberg) and his talking teddy bear (MacFarlane) who keeps John and his girlfriend Lori Collins (Mila Kunis) from moving on with their lives. The film received generally favorable reviews from both critics and audiences, and was a box office success, opening with the highest weekend gross of all time for an original R-rated comedy. Internationally, the movie is currently the highest-grossing original R-rated comedy of all time, beating The Hangover. A sequel, Ted 2, was released on June 26, 2015.

It was announced in June 2021 that Peacock had given a straight to series order for a prequel series. In addition to serving as executive producer for the series, MacFarlane reprises his role as the titular character Ted. Due to the prequel nature of the series, film stars Mark Wahlberg and Mila Kunis are not expected to reprise their roles.

A Million Ways to Die in the West

MacFarlane co-wrote and starred in his second film, A Million Ways to Die in the West. Alec Sulkin and Wellesley Wild were also co-writers for the film. The film follows a cowardly sheep farmer (MacFarlane) who loses a gunfight and sees his girlfriend leave him for another man. When a mysterious woman rides into town, she helps him find his courage. But when her outlaw husband arrives seeking revenge, the farmer must put his newfound courage to the test. The film was met with mixed to negative reviews from critics.

On January 27, 2014, MacFarlane announced that he wrote a companion novel based on the film's script, which was released on March 4, 2014. An audio-book version was also made available, narrated by Jonathan Frakes. MacFarlane wrote the book on weekends during shooting for the film, partially due to boredom.

Music career

Record deal and albums 
In 2010, MacFarlane signed a record deal with Universal Republic Records. He released his debut album, Music Is Better Than Words, in 2011. The album is a big band/standards album drawing on his training in and attraction to "the Great American Songbook and particularly the early- to late-'50s era of orchestration". It was nominated in the Best Traditional Pop Vocal Album and the Best Engineered Album, Non-Classical categories at the 54th Grammy Awards. It received a score of 52 out of 100 on Metacritic's compilation of music critic reviews.

He was featured on Calabria Foti's 2013 single "Let's Fall in Love". In 2014, he released his second studio album Holiday for Swing, a Christmas album including collaborations with Norah Jones and Sara Bareilles. It received mostly positive reviews. In 2015, his third studio album No One Ever Tells You was nominated for a Grammy Award for Best Traditional Pop Vocal Album. In 2016, he was honored by Barbara Sinatra at the 28th annual Frank Sinatra Celebrity Invitational, and recorded the song "Pure Imagination" as a duet with Barbra Streisand for her album Encore: Movie Partners Sing Broadway.

He released his fourth studio album, In Full Swing, in 2017, again featuring songs composed by Joel McNeely. Three singles were released from it: "That Face", "Almost Like Being in Love", and "Have You Met Miss Jones?" The album was nominated for two Grammy Awards for Best Traditional Pop Vocal Album and Best Arrangement, Instrumental and Vocals. In 2019, for his fifth studio album Once in a While, MacFarlane worked with composer Andrew Cottee.

In 2020, MacFarlane released his sixth studio album, Great Songs From Stage & Screen, with composer Bruce Broughton, who he works with on The Orville, to compose the album. Like his previous four albums, he recorded a majority of the songs at Abbey Road Studios. However, much of the albums post-production work was done at home due to the COVID-19 pandemic. In 2022, he released his seventh studio album, Blue Skies.

Collaborations 
MacFarlane collaborated with Sara Bareilles on two of his albums, Music Is Better Than Words (2011), and Holiday for Swing (2014) singing "Love Won't Let You Get Away" and "Baby, It's Cold Outside" respectively. Together they performed the song "Love You Let You Get Away" in his 2011 Epix concert Seth MacFarlane: Swingin' in Concert in 2011. He also collaborated with Norah Jones on three of his albums, Music is Better Than Words (2011), Holiday for Swing (2014), and In Full Swing (2017) singing "Two Sleepy People", "Little Jack Frost Get Lost", and "	"If I Had a Talking Picture of You" respectively. She also sang his Academy Award nominated song "Everybody Needs a Best Friend" from Ted which she performed at the 85th Academy Awards.

During the COVID-19 pandemic, MacFarlane and Elizabeth Gillies collaborated on a series of songs, eight in total, on a playlist entitled, Songs from Home on Spotify.
MacFarlane sang numerous show tunes with Ariana Grande on an episode of Carpool Karaoke: The Series in 2017.

Other projects
MacFarlane was executive producer of a 2020 feature film adapting Clive Barker’s novel Books of Blood for Hulu, directed by Brannon Braga.

In 2020, he signed a $200 million deal with NBCUniversal to develop television projects for both internal and external networks, including the company’s then-developing streaming service Peacock. Among these projects is The End is Nye, hosted by Bill Nye, a six episode series exploring and explaining six apocalyptic scenarios. MacFarlane is executive producer and will make small appearances in each episode. It premiered on the service on August 25, 2022.

In January 2021, it was announced that MacFarlane had been hired to further develop the project. After MacFarlane had previously expressed interest in casting Liam Neeson as Frank Drebin Jr. in 2015, the filmmaker was hired by the studio. Neeson revealed that the filmmaker alongside Paramount Pictures had approached him with a pitch to star in the movie. In June of the same year, Neeson stated that MacFarlane was working on a new draft of the script, with the studio additionally negotiating the filmmaker's potential role as director. He expressed excitement for the project and the opportunity to explore a more comedic role, should he decide to star in the movie; while stating that development on the project is ongoing. In October 2022, the film was officially greenlit with Neeson in the lead role. The film will be directed by Akiva Schaffer, Dan Gregor and Doug Mand were hired to write a new draft of the script, from a previous draft with contributions from Mark Hentemann, Alec Sulkin, and MacFarlane himself. MacFarlane and Erica Huggins will serve as producers.

Guest appearances
MacFarlane has appeared in sitcoms, comedy and news programs, independent films, and other animated shows. In 2002, MacFarlane appeared in the Gilmore Girls episode "Lorelai's Graduation Day". Four years later on November 5, 2006, MacFarlane guest starred on Fox's The War at Home as "Hillary's Date", an unnamed 33-year-old man who secretly dates teenaged Hillary in the episode "I Wash My Hands of You". MacFarlane also appeared as the engineer Ensign Rivers on Star Trek: Enterprise in the third-season episode "The Forgotten" and the fourth-season episode "Affliction". During 2006, MacFarlane had a role in the independent film Life is Short. He has been a frequent guest on the radio talkshow Loveline, hosted by Dr. Drew Pinsky.

MacFarlane appeared on the November 11, 2006, episode of Fox's comedy show MADtv. MacFarlane has also appeared on news shows and late night television shows such as Jimmy Kimmel Live! and Late Show with David Letterman. Three months later on March 24, 2007, MacFarlane was interviewed on Fox's Talkshow with Spike Feresten, and closed the show by singing the Frank Sinatra song "You Make Me Feel So Young". He also provided Stewie's voice when he appeared as a brain tumor-induced hallucination to Seeley Booth in an episode of Bones, writing his own dialogue for the episode. On May 8, 2009, MacFarlane was a guest on Real Time with Bill Maher.

Other than Family Guy and American Dad!, MacFarlane voices characters in other cartoon shows and films. He voiced Wayne "The Brain" McClain in an episode of Aqua Teen Hunger Force. He has also voiced various characters on Adult Swim's Robot Chicken, including a parody of Lion-O and Emperor Palpatine as well as Peter Griffin in the Season 2 premiere – he even parodied himself in the Season 4 premiere, in which he renewed the show simply by mentioning it in a Family Guy-like cutaway after its fictitious cancellation at the end of Season 3. He also played the villain "The Manotaur" in Bob Boyle's animated kids series Yin Yang Yo!. In addition, MacFarlane voiced Johann Kraus in the 2008 film Hellboy II: The Golden Army. He also had a guest appearance in the animated film Futurama: Into the Wild Green Yonder where he sings "That Was Then (And This is Too)", the opening theme. He had also starred in a commercial for Hulu in which he plays an alien presenting Hulu as an "evil plot to destroy the world", progressively as his famous Family Guy and American Dad! characters. He also lent his voice to the series finale movie of the Comedy Central series, Drawn Together.

MacFarlane played Ziggy in the 2010 film Tooth Fairy. In August 2010, he appeared as a guest voice-over in a sci-fi themed episode of Disney's Phineas and Ferb entitled "Nerds of a Feather". On September 15, 2012, MacFarlane hosted the season premiere of Saturday Night Live, with musical guest Frank Ocean. The episode was MacFarlane's first appearance on the show. MacFarlane had a cameo in the 2013 film Movie 43. MacFarlane collaborated with Matt Groening on an episode of The Simpsons and Futurama. In 2016, he had a voice role in the animated film Sing, as well as serving as a major performer on the film's soundtrack. In 2017, he appeared in Steven Soderbergh's heist comedy Logan Lucky, alongside Channing Tatum and Adam Driver. In 2019, MacFarlane appeared in the Showtime limited series The Loudest Voice.

Artistry

Musical style

MacFarlane has a baritone voice. He is a pianist and singer who, in his early years, trained with Lee and Sally Sweetland, the vocal coaches of Barbra Streisand and Frank Sinatra. In an interview with NPR, he commented on their training style: "They really drill you. They teach you the old-style way of singing, back when you had no electronic help ... [They teach you to] show your teeth. If you look at old photos of Sinatra while he's singing, there's a lot of very exposed teeth. That was something Lee Sweetland hit on day in and day out, and correctly so, because it just brightens the whole performance." 
In 2009, MacFarlane appeared as a vocalist at the BBC Proms with the John Wilson Orchestra in Prom 22, A Celebration of Classic MGM Film Musicals. In 2010, he reappeared at the Proms with the John Wilson Orchestra in a Christmas concert special. In 2012, it was announced he would again appear at the Proms with the John Wilson Orchestra in a concert celebrating Broadway musicals. In 2015, MacFarlane again appeared at The Proms as a vocalist with the John Wilson Orchestra, this time in a Sinatra program. Regarding his musical passion, MacFarlane has said, "I love and am fascinated by exciting orchestration—what you can do with a band that size—and I think in many ways it's a lost art." His music is predominantly vocal jazz, show tunes, and swing. He also uses musical comedy in his shows and movies.

Influences
MacFarlane has said that his comedy influences include Woody Allen, Jackie Gleason, Bill Maher, Mel Brooks, and Monty Python; while his musical influences include Frank Sinatra, Dean Martin, Vic Damone, Johnny Mercer, Bing Crosby, Bobby Darin, Gordon MacRae, and the Rat Pack.

Activism

Political views
MacFarlane is a lifelong supporter of the Democratic Party. He has donated over US$200,000 to various Democratic congressional committees and to the 2008 presidential campaign of then-U.S. Senator Barack Obama. He has stated that he supports the legalization of cannabis.

In 2015, MacFarlane revealed support for Bernie Sanders in the 2016 U.S. presidential election, and he introduced Sanders onstage at a Los Angeles rally. After the primaries, he supported Hillary Clinton for president during the general election. In 2019, he supported Pete Buttigieg in the 2020 U.S. presidential election. After the primaries, he endorsed Joe Biden for president during the general election.

LGBT advocacy

MacFarlane has been outspoken about his support for gay rights. In 2008, prior to the holding of the U.S. Supreme Court in Obergefell v. Hodges, MacFarlane called it "infuriating and idiotic" that two gay partners "have to go through this fucking dog and pony act when they stop at a hotel and the guy behind the counter says, 'You want one room or two?'" He went on to say, "I'm incredibly passionate about my support for the gay community and what they're dealing with at this current point in time".

In recognition of "his active, passionate commitment to humanist values, and his fearless support of equal marriage rights and other social justice issues", MacFarlane was named the Harvard Humanist of the Year in 2011.

MacFarlane was criticized for his portrayal of transsexualism in the Family Guy episode "Quagmire's Dad". Gay novelist Brent Hartinger found the episode's inclusion of transphobic remarks from Peter and Lois Griffin—as well as a scene of Brian vomiting profusely upon discovering his new girlfriend to be Glenn Quagmire's father—to be "shockingly insensitive". Hartinger continued, "Frankly, it's literally impossible for me to reconcile last night's episode with MacFarlane's words, unless I come to the conclusion that the man is pretty much a complete idiot". The Gay and Lesbian Alliance Against Defamation, an LGBT media watchdog organization, shared "serious concerns being voiced from members of the community" about the episode. MacFarlane said he was "surprised" by the negative reaction to "Quagmire's Dad", saying that "it seemed that [gay commentators] were not picking up on the fact that it was a very sympathetic portrayal of a transsexual character". He further added, "Look, Brian happens to be a heterosexual character, as I am. If I found out that I had slept with a transsexual, I might throw up in the same way that a gay guy looks at a vagina and goes, 'Oh, my God, that's disgusting.'"

Speaking engagements
MacFarlane is a frequent speaking guest on college campuses. On April 16, 2006, he was invited by Stanford University's ASSU Speakers' Bureau to address an audience of over 1,000 at Memorial Auditorium. He was invited by Harvard University's class of 2006 to deliver the "class day" address on June 7, 2006. He spoke as himself, and also as Peter Griffin, Stewie Griffin and Glenn Quagmire. He has also spoken at George Washington University, Washington University in St. Louis, the University of Texas at Austin, the University of Missouri, University of Toledo, Bowling Green State University, and Loyola Marymount University.

2007–08 Writers Guild of America strike

During the 2007–08 Writers Guild of America strike, MacFarlane publicly sided with the Writers Guild, and fully participated in the strike. Official production of Family Guy was halted for most of December 2007 and various periods afterwards. Fox continued producing episodes without MacFarlane's final approval, and although he refused to work on the show during the strike, his contract with Fox required him to contribute to any episodes it subsequently produced. Rumors of continued production on Family Guy prompted the statement from MacFarlane that ".....it would just be a colossal dick move if they did that". During the strike, MacFarlane wrote an inside joke into an episode of Family Guy about Jon Stewart's choice to return to the air and undermine the writers of The Daily Show, causing Stewart to respond with an angry phone-call, harassing MacFarlane and arguing his point. The strike ended on February 12, 2008.

The Carl Sagan and Ann Druyan Archive
MacFarlane donated money to create The Seth MacFarlane Collection of the Carl Sagan and Ann Druyan Archive at the Library of Congress. MacFarlane said, "The work of Carl Sagan has been a profound influence in my life, and the life of every individual who recognizes the importance of humanity's ongoing commitment to the exploration of our universe [...] The continuance of our journey outward into space should always occupy some part of our collective attention, regardless of whatever Snooki did last week."

Personal life
MacFarlane lives in Beverly Hills, California. He is not married nor does he have any children.

In a 2004 interview with The Daily Princetonian, he noted his similarities to Brian Griffin from Family Guy: "I have some Brian type issues from time to time—looking for the right person—but I date as much as the next guy."

On July 16, 2010, MacFarlane's mother, Ann Perry Sager, died from cancer. Her death was reported by Larry King on his show Larry King Live, who acknowledged a conversation he had with her during an interview with MacFarlane in May 2010.

From 2012 to 2013, MacFarlane was in a relationship with Emilia Clarke.

MacFarlane is an outspoken atheist, and has referenced his criticism of religion through many of his works, most notably through Family Guy.

September 11, 2001 experience
On the morning of September 11, 2001, MacFarlane was scheduled to return to Los Angeles on American Airlines Flight 11 from Boston. Suffering from a hangover after the previous night's celebrations that followed his speech at his alma mater, the Rhode Island School of Design, and with an incorrect departure time (8:15 a.m. instead of 7:45 a.m.) from his travel agent, he arrived at Logan International Airport about ten minutes too late to board the flight, as the gates had been closed. Fifteen minutes after departure, American Airlines Flight 11 was hijacked, and at 8:46 a.m. it was flown into the North Tower of the World Trade Center, killing everyone on board. MacFarlane said:The only reason it hasn't really affected me as it maybe could have is I didn't really know that I was in any danger until after it was over, so I never had that panic moment. After the fact, it was sobering, but people have a lot of close calls; you're crossing the street and you almost get hit by a car... This one just happened to be related to something massive. I really can't let it affect me because I'm a comedy writer. I have to put that in the back of my head.

Family Guy made reference to the incident in the episode "Boy (Dog) Meets Girl (Dog)".

Lawsuits
On October 3, 2007, Bourne Co. Music Publishers filed a lawsuit accusing Family Guy of infringing its copyright on the song "When You Wish Upon a Star", through a parody song titled "I Need a Jew" appearing in the episode "When You Wish Upon a Weinstein". Bourne Co., which holds the copyright, alleged the parody pairs a "thinly veiled" copy of their music with antisemitic lyrics. Named in the suit were MacFarlane, 20th Century Fox Film Corp., Fox Broadcasting Co., Cartoon Network, and Walter Murphy; the suit sought to stop the program's distribution and asked for unspecified damages. Bourne argued that "I Need a Jew" uses the copyrighted melody of "When You Wish Upon a Star" without commenting on that song, and that it was therefore not a First Amendment-protected parody per the ruling in Campbell v. Acuff-Rose Music, Inc. On March 16, 2009, United States District Judge Deborah Batts held that Family Guy did not infringe on Bourne's copyright when it transformed the song for comical use in an episode.

In December 2007, Family Guy was again accused of copyright infringement when actor Art Metrano filed a lawsuit regarding a scene in Stewie Griffin: The Untold Story, in which Jesus performs Metrano's signature magic parody act, involving absurd faux magical hand gestures while humming the distinctive tune "Fine and Dandy". MacFarlane, 20th Century Fox, Steve Callaghan, and Alex Borstein were all named in the suit. In July 2009, a federal district court judge rejected Fox's motion to dismiss, saying that the first three fair use factors involved—"purpose and character of the use", "nature of the infringed work", and "amount and substantiality of the taking"—counted in Metrano's favor, while the fourth—"economic impact"—had to await more fact-finding. In denying the dismissal, the court held that the reference in the scene made light of Jesus and his followers—not Metrano or his act. The case was settled out of court in 2010 with undisclosed terms.

On July 16, 2014, MacFarlane was served with a lawsuit from the production company of a series of Internet videos called Charlie the Abusive Teddy Bear claiming that Ted infringes on the copyright of its videos due to the Ted bear largely matching the background story, persona, voice tone, attitude, and dialogue of the Charlie bear. The suit was dismissed with prejudice on March 23, 2015, after the plaintiffs conceded Ted was independently created and withdrew the suit.

Awards and nominations

MacFarlane has been nominated for twenty-four Primetime Emmy Awards for his work on Family Guy and has won five times, in 2000, 2002, 2016, 2017 and 2019. He has been nominated for five Grammy Awards for his work in Family Guy: Live in Vegas, Music Is Better Than Words, Family Guy, No One Ever Tells You, and In Full Swing. He was nominated for an Academy Award for Best Original Song for co-writing the opening song, "Everybody Needs a Best Friend", from his film Ted with the film's composer Walter Murphy.

He has received numerous awards from other organizations, including the Annie Award for Best Voice Acting in an Animated Television Production and the Saturn Award for Best Television Presentation for the Family Guy episode titled "Blue Harvest", the MTV Movie Award for Best On-Screen Duo and the Empire Award for Best Comedy for Ted. In 2019, MacFarlane received a star on the Hollywood Walk of Fame at 6259 Hollywood Blvd. In 2020, he was inducted into the Television Hall of Fame.

In 2022, a new species of Hyloscirtus frog (Hyloscirtus sethmacfarlanei) was described from Ecuador and named after MacFarlane.

Filmography

 Stewie Griffin: The Untold Story (2005)
 Hellboy II: The Golden Army (2008)
 Futurama: Into the Wild Green Yonder (2009)
 The Drawn Together Movie: The Movie! (2010)
 Tooth Fairy (2010)
 Ted (2012)
 Movie 43 (2013)
 A Million Ways to Die in the West (2014)
 Ted 2 (2015)
 Sing (2016)
 Logan Lucky (2017)
 The Orville (2017–present)

Discography

Albums

Studio albums

Soundtrack albums

Extended plays

Singles

As main artist

As featuring artist

Other charted songs

Guest appearances

Written works

References

Notes

External links

 
 
 Seth MacFarlane on Hollywood Bowl

1973 births
20th-century American comedians
20th-century American male actors
20th-century American singers
20th-century American writers
20th-century atheists
21st-century American comedians
21st-century American male actors
21st-century American singers
21st-century American writers
21st-century atheists
Actors from Providence, Rhode Island
American atheists
American baritones
American cannabis activists
American cartoonists
American comedy musicians
American crooners
American film producers
American jazz singers
American impressionists (entertainers)
American male comedians
American male film actors
American male comedy actors
American male screenwriters
American male singer-songwriters
American male television actors
American male video game actors
American male voice actors
American political activists
American satirists
American stand-up comedians
American storyboard artists
American surrealist artists
American television directors
American television producers
American television writers
Animators from Connecticut
Annie Award winners
Comedians from Connecticut
Comedians from Rhode Island
Comedy film directors
Connecticut Democrats
Critics of religions
Film directors from Connecticut
Former Roman Catholics
Hanna-Barbera people
Kent School alumni
American LGBT rights activists
Living people
Male actors from Connecticut
Male actors from Rhode Island
American male jazz musicians
American male television writers
Musicians from Providence, Rhode Island
American parodists
Peabody Award winners
People from Kent, Connecticut
Primetime Emmy Award winners
Republic Records artists
Rhode Island School of Design alumni
Rhode Island Democrats
Screenwriters from Rhode Island
Singers from Rhode Island
Showrunners
Swing singers
Traditional pop music singers
Universal Records artists
Verve Records artists
Writers from Connecticut
Writers from Providence, Rhode Island
20th-century American male singers
21st-century American male singers
Television producers from Connecticut
Singer-songwriters from Connecticut
Rhode Island School of Design alumni in music